ESPRESSO (Echelle Spectrograph for Rocky Exoplanet- and Stable Spectroscopic Observations) is a third-generation, fiber fed, cross-dispersed, echelle spectrograph mounted on the European Southern Observatory's Very Large Telescope (VLT). The unit saw its first light on September 25, 2016.

ESPRESSO is the successor of a line of echelle spectrometers that include CORAVEL, Elodie, Coralie, and HARPS. It measures changes in the light spectrum with great sensitivity, and is being used to search for Earth-size rocky exoplanets via the radial velocity method. For example, Earth induces a radial-velocity variation of 9 cm/s on the Sun; this gravitational "wobble" causes minute variations in the color of sunlight, invisible to the human eye but detectable by the instrument. The telescope light is fed to the instrument, located in the VLT Combined-Coude Laboratory 70 meters away from the telescope, where the light from up to four unit telescopes of the VLT can be combined. The principal investigator is Francesco Pepe.

Sensitivity 

ESPRESSO builds on the foundations laid by the High Accuracy Radial Velocity Planet Searcher (HARPS) instrument at the 3.6-metre telescope at ESO's La Silla Observatory. ESPRESSO benefits not only from the much larger combined light-collecting capacity of the four 8.2-metre VLT Unit Telescopes, but also from improvements in the stability and calibration accuracy that are now possible by laser frequency comb technology. The requirement is to reach 10 cm/s, but the aimed goal is to obtain a precision level of a few cm/s. This would mean a large step forward over current radial-velocity spectrographs like ESO's HARPS. The HARPS instrument can attain a precision of 97 cm/s (3.5 km/h), with an effective precision of the order of 30 cm/s, making it one of only two spectrographs worldwide with such accuracy. The ESPRESSO would greatly exceed this capability making detection of Earth-size planets from ground-based instruments possible. Commissioning of ESPRESSO at the VLT started late 2017.

The instrument is capable of operating in 1-UT mode (using one of the telescopes) and in 4-UT mode. In 4-UT mode, in which all the four 8-m telescopes are connected incoherently to form a 16-m equivalent telescope, the spectrograph detects extremely faint objects.

For example, for G2V type stars:
 Rocky planets around stars as faint as V ≈ 9 in (in 1-UT mode)
 Neptune mass planets around stars as faint as V ≈ 12 (in 4-UT mode )
 Earth-size rocky planets around stars as faint as V ≈ 9 (CODEX on the E-ELT) 

The best-suited candidate stars for ESPRESSO are non-active, non-rotating, quiet G dwarfs to red dwarfs. It operates at the peak of its efficiency for a spectral type up to M4-type stars.

Instrument 

For calibration, ESPRESSO uses a laser frequency comb (LFC), with backup of two ThAr lamps. It features three instrumental modes: singleHR, singleUHR and multiMR. In the singleHR mode ESPRESSO can be fed by any of the four UTs.

Status 
 
All design work was completed and finalised by April 2013, with the manufacturing phase of the project commencing thereafter.
ESPRESSO was tested on June 3, 2016.
ESPRESSO first light occurred on September 25, 2016, during which they spotted various objects, among them the star 60 Sgr A. After being shipped to Chile, installed at the VLT, ESPRESSO saw its first light there on 27 November 2017, in 1-UT mode, observing the star Tau Ceti; the first star observed in the 4-UT mode was on February 3, 2018.

ESPRESSO has been opened to the astronomical community in the 1-UT mode (one single telescope used), and is producing scientific data since October 24, 2018. On quiet stars it has already demonstrated radial-velocity precision of 25 cm/s over a full night. However, there have been some problems, for example, in light collecting efficiency which was around 30% lower than expected and required. And so, some fine-tuning, including replacing the parts causing the efficiency problem and subsequent re-testing, were to be done on the instrument before the full 4-UT mode was open to the scientific community in April 2019. A problem was discovered in the ESPRESSO charge-coupled device controllers, digital imaging hardware, where a differential nonlinearity issue has reduced the resolution obtainable more severely than was previously feared. The ESO detector team that determined the source of the problem is currently,  working on a new version of the associated hardware in order to remedy this hopefully temporary setback.

On August 29, 2019, the ESPRESSO ETC was updated to reflect the gain in transmission after the technical mission of July. This gain influx was, on average, ≈50% in the UHR and HR modes and ≈40% in the MR.

As of April 6, 2020, the red radial velocity detector has, at least for a very short time, achieved the ≈10  cm/s precision, while the blue detector has so far only managed ≈60  cm/s. Due to the limited spectral coverage and lack of reliability, the Laser Frequency Comb (LFC) is currently not integrated into the telescope and for now complete wavelength calibration will have to rely on the two backup ThAr lamps, with resultant radial velocity measurements values limited by photon noise, stellar jitter and so less precise than expected. The ESPRESSO operator and detector teams are working to characterize and correct the problem, with a dedicated mission expected to take place during 2020.

On May 24, 2020, a team-leading by A. Suárez Mascareño confirmed the existence of Proxima b they also found that it is 1.17 times the mass of Earth, smaller than the older estimate of 1.3 times and is located in the habitable zone of its star, which it orbits in 11.2 days. ESPRESSO achieved an accuracy of 26 centimeters a second (cm/s) or about three times more precise than that obtained with HARPS. They also found a second signal in the data that could be of planetary origin with a semi-amplitude of only 40 cm/s and a 5.15 days period.

On August 28, 2020, it was announced that in the coming weeks minimal science operations are planned to be resumed at the Paranal Observatory, following after a 5-month suspension due to the COVID-19 pandemic.

As of June 11, 2021, there is still an ongoing issue with the blue cryostat detector caused by temperature instabilities, and there has been a communication problem between the Atmospheric Dispersion
Corrector and the rest of the instrument, these issues are currently reducing the detection resolution achievable with the instrument.

A major instrument intervention is scheduled between May 1 and May 16, 2022, and the instrument will be out of operations between May 1 until around May 23. After the intervention, an improvement in the overall instrument performance, and in the radial velocity stability, particularly in the blue detector, is expected.

As a result of the instrument intervention the blue cryostat stability has dramatically improved. However, because of a change of the cross dispersion and dispersion direction positions (in both the x and y direction) from the red and blue cryostat detectors induced by the instrument intervention, combining data from different pixels to produce a focused image has become problematic in the MR4x2 mode and the new HR4x2 mode. This problem should be fixed in the new pipeline version, i.e. in an upcoming software update.

Scientific objectives 
The main scientific objectives for ESPRESSO are:

 The measurement of high precision radial velocities of solar type stars for the search for rocky planets in the habitable zone of their star.
 The measurement of the variation of the physical constants 
 The analysis of the chemical composition of stars in nearby galaxies.

Consortium 
ESPRESSO is being developed by a consortium consisting on the European Southern Observatory (ESO) and seven scientific institutes:

 Centre for Astrophysics of the University of Porto (Portugal)
 Faculdade de Ciências da Universidade de Lisboa, CAAUL & LOLS (Portugal)
 Trieste Astronomical Observatory (Italy)
 Brera Astronomical Observatory (Italy)
 Instituto de Astrofísica de Canarias (Spain)
 Physics Institute of the University of Bern (Switzerland)
 University of Geneva (Switzerland)
 Institute of Astrophysics and Space Sciences (Portugal)

ESPRESSO specifications

Radial velocity comparison tables

MK-type stars with planets in the habitable zone

See also 

 
 CORALIE spectrograph
 Doppler spectroscopy
 ELODIE spectrograph
 EXPRES spectrograph
 HIRES spectrograph
 List of extrasolar planets
 SOPHIE échelle spectrograph

References

External links 
 
 ESPRESSO at eso.org
 ESPRESSO at unige.ch 
 

Astronomical instruments
Telescope instruments
Exoplanet search projects
Spectrographs